The Haffenreffer Brewery, established in 1870, was a former brewer in Jamaica Plain, Massachusetts. The first Haffenreffer bottles were plate mold bottles and were produced by Karl Hutter of New York and had the traditional lightning stop tops. According to Haffenreffer company records later in 1876 the Haffenreffer Brewery contracted with Dean Foster and Company of Boston to aid in the production of bottles for the brewery and the growing demand. Starting in 1893 all Haffenreffer bottles were produced with Karl Hutter stoppers. Haffenreffer Private Stock, a legacy of the original Haffenreffer & Co. product line, is a brand of malt liquor that ceased production in 2013. It had several nicknames: "The Green Monster", (referring to the left field wall at Fenway Park), "Haffenwrecker" and "The Green Death" all due to relatively high alcohol content.  It was notable due to the Rebus puzzles under the bottle cap, and due to the label recommendation of consuming it "on the rocks", or over ice.

History
The Haffenreffer Brewery was founded by Rudolph Frederick Haffenreffer, a German immigrant who arrived in Boston after the Civil War.  Following his death on March 8, 1929, the business was turned over to his sons, Rudolf F. Haffenreffer Jr. (1874-1954) and Theodore Carl Haffenreffer (1880-1956).  The brewery was subsequently run by other members of the Haffenreffer family, including Rudolph Frederick Haffenreffer III (1902-1991), his brother Carl W. Haffenreffer (1906-1999), and their first cousin, Theodore Carl Haffenreffer III (1917-2008).  The brewery closed in 1965 (at which time, brands like Haffenreffer Lager Beer, Pickwick Ale and Pickwick Bock Beer became the property of the Narragansett Brewing Company) having survived Prohibition and operating for nearly a century, leaving Massachusetts without a brewery for the first time in 300 years.

Haffenreffer complex
The entire Haffenreffer complex was redeveloped by the Jamaica Plain Neighborhood Development Corporation, which owns and operates it today.  The Boston Beer Company, brewer of Samuel Adams beer, has been an anchor tenant and investor since the mid-1980s, and offers tours of the brewery there.

The main brewery building is included on the National Register of Historic Places.

The top of the smokestack from the old Haffenreffer Brewery crumbled and had been partially restored to current building codes-  so the letters on its side read FENREFFER BREWERS for more than 30 years. In late 2016, a local artist installed a circular steel frame to the top with the letters HAF, which restored the smokestack to its full name.

Among those businesses sharing it with Boston Beer are:

 Bella Luna Restaurant
 Bikes Not Bombs
 City Life/Vida Urbana
 Children's Music Center of JP
 Keshet
 Kenyon Woodworking
 JP School of Dance
 Mike's Fitness
 The Parent Review
 ULA Cafe
 Women in the Building Trades

See also
 Private Stock (malt liquor)
 National Register of Historic Places listings in southern Boston, Massachusetts

References

Beer brewing companies based in Massachusetts
Buildings and structures in Boston
1870 establishments in Massachusetts
Commercial buildings on the National Register of Historic Places in Massachusetts
Defunct brewery companies of the United States
Defunct companies based in Massachusetts
Jamaica Plain, Boston
National Register of Historic Places in Boston